The Honduras women's national football team represents Honduras in international women's football. The team is overseen by the National Autonomous Federation of Football of Honduras. Honduras is allowed to participate at the different UNCAF and CONCACAF women's tournaments; as well to the FIFA Women's World Cup, although they haven't been able to qualify as of yet.

History 
Although Honduras did not qualify for the 2015 FIFA Women's World Cup, the Catrachas scored 8 goals against Belize in 2014, setting a record for most goals scored by the national women's team in a full international match. The final score was 8–0, with Jenny Alarcón scoring four goals.

Results and fixtures

The following is a list of match results in the last 12 months, as well as any future matches that have been scheduled.

Legend

2022

Honduras Results and Fixtures – Soccerway.com
Honduras Results and Fixtures – FIFA.com

Players

Current squad
The following players were called up for the match against Saint Vincent and the Grenadines on 12 April 2022.

Recent call ups

Honours
Central American Games
Silver medal (1): 2001

Competitive record

FIFA Women's World Cup

*Draws include knockout matches decided on penalty kicks.

Olympic Games

*Draws include knockout matches decided on penalty kicks.

CONCACAF Women's Championship

*Draws include knockout matches decided on penalty kicks.

Pan American Games

*Draws include knockout matches decided on penalty kicks.

Central American and Caribbean Games

*Draws include knockout matches decided on penalty kicks.

Central American Games

*Draws include knockout matches decided on penalty kicks.

See also 
Football in Honduras

References

External links
Official website
FIFA profile

 
Central American women's national association football teams
Women's sport in Honduras